The Dubois River (designated "Chainey River" until 2006) is a tributary of the Bécancour River which is a tributary of the south shore of the St. Lawrence River.

The Dubois River flows through the municipalities of Saint-Adrien-d'Irlande, Irlande, in the Les Appalaches Regional County Municipality (MRC), in the administrative region of Chaudière-Appalaches, and Saint-Ferdinand of the MRC of L'Érable Regional County Municipality (Centre-du-Québec), in Quebec, Canada.

Geography 

The main neighboring hydrographic slopes of the Dubois River are:
 north side: Carrier stream, Bullard stream, Bécancour River;
 east side: Bullard stream, Morency stream, Bagot River;
 south side: Bécancour River, Lac à la Truite, McLean stream;
 west side: Bécancour River.

From its head area, the Dubois River flows over  divided into the following segments:
  southwesterly, to the municipal boundary between Saint-Adrien-d'Irlande, Irlande;
  southwesterly, to the route 216 bridge;
  southwesterly, up to the municipal boundary between Irlande and Saint-Ferdinand;
  southwesterly, crossing route 165, to its confluence.

The Dubois River flows onto the east shore of William Lake, which is crossed to the north by the Bécancour River.

Toponymy 

The toponym "rivière Dubois" was made official on June 12, 2006, at the Commission de toponymie du Québec.

See also 

 List of rivers of Quebec

References 

Rivers of Centre-du-Québec
Rivers of Chaudière-Appalaches
L'Érable Regional County Municipality
Les Appalaches Regional County Municipality